WASP-55 is a G-type main-sequence star about 980 light-years away. WASP-55 is similar to the Sun in concentration of heavy elements.

Planetary system
In 2012 a transiting hot Jupiter planet b was detected on a tight, circular orbit.

References

Virgo (constellation)
G-type main-sequence stars
Planetary systems with one confirmed planet
Planetary transit variables
J13350194-1730124